Kosmos 419 ( meaning Cosmos 419), also known as 3MS No.170 was a failed Soviet spacecraft intended to visit Mars. The spacecraft was launched on 10 May 1971, however due to an upper stage malfunction it failed to depart low Earth orbit.

Background 
In 1971, Mars was at its closest to Earth since 1956 and in May of that year both the Soviet Union and the United States made new attempts to reach the Red Planet. Kosmos 419 was intended to overtake the United States probes, Mariner 8 and Mariner 9, in the aim of becoming the first Mars orbiter. As it was, Mariner 8 was lost in a launch failure two days before Kosmos 419 was launched, and Mariner 9 went on to become the first spacecraft to orbit Mars.

Launch 
Kosmos 419 was one of three Mars spacecraft launched by the Soviet Union in 1971, the others being Mars 2 and Mars 3; launched days after Kosmos 419. Unlike the 4M spacecraft, Mars 2 and 3, Kosmos 419 was a 3MS spacecraft which consisted only of an orbiter, with no lander. It was the ninth Soviet spacecraft launched to Mars.

Orbit 
The Blok D's ignition timer was incorrectly set, resulting in it failing to ignite; the timer had been set so that the stage would ignite 1.5 years after launch rather than the intended 1.5 hours. Due to its low orbit, which quickly decayed, Kosmos 419 reentered the Earth's atmosphere on 12 May 1971, two days after launch.

The designation Kosmos 419 was a generic name given to Soviet spacecraft operating in Earth orbit; at the time Soviet planetary spacecraft which failed to depart Earth orbit would be given designations in the Kosmos series to disguise the failure. Had it departed Earth orbit, Kosmos 419 would have become Mars 2, a designation which was used instead for the next mission, 4M No.171.

Scientific Instruments 

 Fluxgate Magnetometer
 Infrared Radiometer
 Infrared Photometer
 Spectrometer
 Photometer
 Radiometer
 Ultraviolet Photometer
 Cosmic-ray detector
 Charged particle spectrometer
 Imaging System
 Stereo antenna

See also

 1971 in spaceflight
 List of missions to Mars
 Timeline of artificial satellites and space probes

References

1971 in the Soviet Union
Spacecraft launched in 1971
Mars program
Kosmos 0419
4MV